Julia Laffranque (born Vahing; 25 July 1974), is an Estonian jurist, judge, legal scientist (doctor iuris), visiting professor of European law  Justice at the Supreme Court of Estonia, Judge at the European Court of Human Rights 2011 - 2020 (Vice-President of the Second Section of the European Court of Human Rights 2015-2018). Since 4 June 2018 also a member of the Scientific Committee of the European Union Fundamental Rights Agency, earlier professor of European law at the University of Tartu. Since 2020 member of the Board of Trustees, the Foundation Academy of European Law Trier (Europäische Rechtsakademie, ERA). In 2019 she was a candidate for the post of European Ombudsman. In 2020 she was appointed as Director of Programme of the European Law Academy (ERA) and in 2021 the Council of the European Union on the proposal of European Parliament by 586 votes in favor, appointed her as a member of Article 255 TFEU panel, which is to give opinion on candidates suitability to perform the duties of judge and advocate general of the Court of Justice and the General Court of the European Union.

Education
She graduated with outstanding honors of the Litchfield High School, Connecticut, USA in 1991.
She graduated with a gold of the Tallinna Õismäe Humanitaargümnaasium 1992.
In 1997 she graduated the Law Faculty of Tartu University (including studies at the Law Faculty of Hamburg University 1994–1995)
and in  1998 she received her Master's degree in law (magistra legum, LL.M.) of the Law Faculty of Münster University, Germany, summa cum laude.
She attended doctoral studies at the University of Kiel and the European University Institute in Florence and in 2003 received her doctoral degree in jurisprudence (doctor iuris, dr. iur.) University of Tartu.

Career

 1996 – 2004 – Ministry of Justice of Estonia: head of the EU law and foreign relations division, 2002 - 2004 Deputy Secretary General on Legislative Drafting;
 2004 – 2010 – justice at the Supreme Court of Estonia (member of the administrative law chamber), 2007 – 2010 member of the constitutional review chamber of the Supreme Court;
 2006 – 2011 – docent of European Union Law at the Law Faculty of Tartu University, later (2011-2016) professor of European law at the same faculty;
 2011 – 2020 – judge at the European Court of Human Rights(EHCR) (2015 - 2018 Vice- President of II Section) and Professor of European Law at the University of Tartu (since 2017 honorary professor). As an EHCR judge, she was cited in an NGO report for having sat on several cases in which the Open Society Justice Initiative was the applicant or involved as a third party. Because of previous link with the Open Society Foundation in 1999 and as a member of the think-tank "Praxis" (at this time funded by the Open Society), this could raise the question of a conflict of interest. 
 since 2020 – justice at the Supreme Court of Estonia
 2021 - Deputy Director and Director of Programmes of Academy of European Law (ERA)

Secondments, membership

Dr. iur. Laffranque has completed traineeships at the Legal Service of the European Commission, at the Ministries of Justice in Sweden and France, the Supreme Administrative Court of Germany, and the  Conseil d'Etat of France; she has also served as an ad hoc judge at the European Court of Human Rights;
 1999 member of human rights expert group of Open Estonia Foundation, affiliated to the Open Society Foundation
 2010 – 2016 – member of the Permanent Court of Arbitration
 2006 – 2008 – vice-chair of the Consultative Council of European Judges (CCJE) of the Council of Europe;
 2008 – 2010 – chair of the Consultative Council of European Judges;
 2004 – 2013 – president of the European Law Society of Estonia (FIDE Estonia) since 2013 – honorary president of the same society; 
 2010 – 2012 – president of the International Federation for European Law (FIDE)
 Alumni of Student Society Filiae Patriae (member since 1993) 
 Member of editorial board of : AS Juura (2002 -2004); Juridica (2003 - 2004) and Õiguskeel (2003 – 2004)
 2004 – 2012 – member of the board of the Estonian Academic Law Society;
 2000 – 2004 – member of the board of the policy think-tank "Praxis."
 2005 – 2011 – member of the board of Estonian Lawyers Union (member since 1992)  
 2017 - 2020 - member of the board of Estonian School in Strasbourg 
 2017 - 2020 - member of the committee of Tagora theatre in Strasbourg 
 since 2018 - member of the scientific committee of European Union Fundamental Rights Agency, Vienna
 since 2018 - member of the board of Tagaranna Village Society 
 2020 - member of the Working Group for the development of the HELP course on Judicial Ethics, Council of Europe 
 2020 - 2023 member of the Board of Trustees, the Foundation Academy of European Law Trier (Europäische Rechtsakademie, ERA)
 2021 - member of the Article 255 of the Treaty on Functioning of the EU panel re-elected for the next term starting in March 2022 
 2021 - member of the board of Friends of ERA

Books

 Euroopa Liit ja Euroopa Ühendus. Institutsioonid ja õigus (European Union and European Community. Institutions and Law. Sisekaitseakadeemia 1999)
 Euroopa Kohtu Lahendid I ja II. Kogumiku koostaja ja Euroopa Kohut tutvustava osa author (Case law of the European Court of Justice (ECJ) in Estonian I and II. Compiler of the book and author of the introductory part about the ECJ. Juura 2001 and 2003)
 Prantsuse -eesti-prantsuse õigussõnaraamat (French-Estonian-French legal dictionary) (together with Rodolphe Laffranque. Juura 2002)
 Eelotsuse küsimine Euroopa Kohtult (Handbook for Estonian judges about asking preliminary references from the ECJ. Eesti Õiguskeskus 2005)
 Euroopa Liidu õigussüsteem ja Eesti õiguse koht selles (The Legal System of European Union and Estonian Law. Juura 2006).
 Euroopa Inimõiguste Kohus ja Eesti õigus (European Court of Human Rights and Estonian law. Juura 2017)
 Dr. iur. Laffranque has published several articles in Estonian, English, German and French languages in Estonian and international legal journals

Honours

 2004 – Chevalier de l'Ordre National du Mérite of France.
 2005 – Order of the White Star, fourth class, Estonia.
 2013 – European of the Year, European Movement of Estonia
 2017 - Best trainer of judges award by Estonian judges

Personal life

Amateur actress of the Vilde theatre in Tartu, Estonia since 2006 and of the Tagora theatre at Council of Europe in Strasbourg since 2011. Director of children plays at the Estonian School in Strasbourg since 2013. Founder and initiator of the Theatre Club of the European Court of Human Rights, Strasbourg 2015.

Some of her roles: Elviine Vestberg in Oskar Luts' "Vaikne nurgake" directed by Raivo Adlas,2007; Linda Vilde and Gertrud Edelstahl von Rostfrei in Veiko Märka "Tabamata ime" directed by Raivo Adlas, 2009; Mina in Maimu Berg "Euroopasse! Euroopasse!" directed by Raivo Adlas, 2010; Jelena Andrejevna in Anton Tshehhov "Onu Vanja" directed by Raivo Adlas, 2011; (J)Elena Popova in Brian Friel's (based on Anton Tshehhov) "The Bear", directed by Jodie Clifford, 2011; spy Liza in C. Chilto and J. Littlewood's, „Oh What a Lovely War“ directed by Louise Palmer, 2012; opera singer and adventuress Irene Adler in Richard Thayer's “Watson in Winter” directed by Richard Thayer and  David Adamson, 2013; Aino Kallas in Maimu Berg's "Aino and Herman", directed by Julia Whitham and Louise Palmer in "La Belle Epoque" (Tagora, Cube Noir Strasbourg), 2013;  Sarah, Amanda, Queen Gertrud and wife of Sir. Thomas Moore in Christopher Durang's „Actors’Nightmare“, directed by David Adamson (Tagora, Au Camionneur, Strasbourg), 2015; Sarah in Ferenc Molnár's, „A Matter of Husbands“, directed by David Crowe (Tagora, Au Camionneur, Strasbourg), 2015; Elizabeth Proctor in Arthur Miller's "The Crucible", directed by Louise Palmer (Tagora, rehearsed reading at the European Court of Human Rights), 2015; Honey in Edward Albee's "Who's Afraid of Virginia Woolf" directed by Martyn Symons (Tagora, Cube Noir, Strasbourg), 2016; William Shakespeare's Hamlet's monologue in Estonian with Tagora theatre and at the European Court of Human Rights, 2016; Lamchop, patient and black sheep, Jonathan Alexandratos "Duck" ("Part") directed by Mike Mecek, Peace Productions Americans in Alsace, 2016; E(dward) Steichen, in Brancusi vs. United States, historic trial reenacted, adapted by Andra Matei – , rehearsed reading, directed by Martyn Symons, 2016; Mrs. Vixen, Baltic scandalist, Richard Brinsley Sheridan, « The School for Scandal », directed by Louise Palmer, 2017; Digna Ochoa, Rana Husseini, Juliana Dogbadzi, Ka Hsaw Wa, Wangari Maathai, Kek Galabru, Marian Wright Edelman, Second Voice, Ariel Dorfman (based on the book by Kerry Kennedy), “Speak Truth to Power. Voices From Beyond the Dark” – directed by Andra Matei, 2017; Katharina Luther in Maimu Berg "Lutheri naine (Luther's wife)", directed by Julia Laffranque, 2017;  Rutt in Maimu Berg "Grandfather" - directed by David Adamson, 2018; Meeta in Janno Villecourt, Maimu Berg "Meeta ja õigus (Meeta and Justice)", directed by Piret Kuub, 2018;  Olimpia Kohary, a refuge/the White Duchess in David Adamson, Hazel Breslin, David Crowe,, Jenny Griffiths, Elena Malagoni, Nick O’Sullivan, Louise & Simon Palmer, Joëlle & Martyn Symons, Richard Thayer, Liam Wright « Alice in Brexitland » – directed by Louise Palmer, Tagora, Cube Noir, Strasbourg, 2019;  Judge B in Bertolt Brecht « In Search of Justice »  –, directed by David Adamson, Tagora Theatre Club of the European Court of Human Rights « Court in the Act », Strasbourg, 2019; Sicco Mansholt in Liliane Tetsi, Princesse Europe, Louise Weiss, la grand’ mère de l’Europe et les pères de l’Europe sont de retour (Princess Europe, Louise Weiss, the ´great mother of Europe and the fathers of Europe are back)”, directed by Liliane Tetsi, EUCASO-(Europe Cameroun Solidarité)/ “Court in the Act”, Strasbourg, 2019; director of the movie "Kuulsused saja aastases Eestis“ , Estonian School in Strasbourg, 2019/2020; Betti Alver poems at Tagaranna Kirjanduspäev, Saaremaa, 2021; Juliette Marchand in Piret Saul-Gorodilov, "Meie autor Eduard Vilde," directed by Raivo Adlas, Vilde Teater, 2021; Prof Greta Kask in "Much Ado About Will", directed by Louise Palmer, Tagora, Strasbourg/Zoom, 2021

She is married to French jurist Rodolphe Laffranque, has three sons: (twins) Oscar Helmut and Tobias Louis (born 2008) and Léo Lennart (born 2018); and is the daughter of writer Maimu Berg and of writer/psychiatrist Vaino Vahing.

References

External links

 (Just) Give Me A Reason …  Julia Laffranque	pp. 12–35 [PDF] https://www.juridicainternational.eu/index.php?id=10522
 Julia Laffranque: millist vaktsiini vajab põhiõiguste kaitse Euroopas? https://www.err.ee/1225504/julia-laffranque-millist-vaktsiini-vajab-pohioiguste-kaitse-euroopas
 Interview to Christina Pfänderile DAAD Alumni Galerie  https://www.daad.de/de/alumni/galerie/portraet/prof-dr-julia-laffranque/ and in English https://www.daad.de/en/alumni/gallery/portrait/prof-dr-julia-laffranque/

20th-century Estonian lawyers
Judges of the European Court of Human Rights
1974 births
Living people
Estonian women judges
Estonian women lawyers
21st-century Estonian judges
University of Tartu alumni
Academic staff of the University of Tartu
Estonian judges of international courts and tribunals
Recipients of the Order of the White Star, 4th Class
21st-century women judges